The 1995 British Speedway Championship was the 35th edition of the British Speedway Championship. The Final took place on 30 April at Brandon in Coventry, England. The Championship was won by Andy Smith, the third time in succession that he had won the title. Joe Screen finished second ahead of Dean Barker in third.

Final 
30 April 1995
 Brandon Stadium, Coventry

{| width=100%
|width=50% valign=top|

See also 
 British Speedway Championship

References 

British Speedway Championship
Great Britain